"Hold On Me" is a song by British pop artist Marlon Roudette, from his debut solo album Matter Fixed. It is the third track on the album. It was released as the fourth and final single from Matter Fixed on 1 June 2012.

"Hold On Me" appeared in the compilation albums Bravo Hits, Vol. 77 and Best of 2012 - Sommerhits. The song was featured in the British reality television series Made in Chelsea.

Music video
A music video directed by "LJ" for the song was released on 20 June 2012 with a total length of three minutes and eighteen seconds. In the video, Marlon is shown sitting in a bedroom and walking on the walls.

References

2012 singles
Marlon Roudette songs
Songs written by Vada Nobles
2011 songs
Universal Music Group singles
Songs written by Marlon Roudette